The Golf Club 2019 featuring PGA Tour is a sports video game developed by HB Studios and published by 2K Sports for Microsoft Windows, PlayStation 4 and Xbox One.

It is the third installment of the PGA Tour 2K series, the first in the overall series to be licensed by the PGA Tour and the final game in the series to be released under The Golf Club name.

Reception

The Golf Club 2019 featuring PGA Tour received "generally favorable reviews" for PlayStation 4 and Xbox One, while the Microsoft Windows version received "mixed or average reviews", according to review aggregator Metacritic.

References

External links
 

2018 video games
2K Sports games
Golf video games
HB Studios games
Multiplayer and single-player video games
PlayStation 4 games
Video games developed in Canada
Windows games
Xbox One games